Foria may refer to:

 Foria, Centola, Campania, Italy, a village
 Nissan Foria, a 2004 Japanese compact coupe concept